This is a list of radio stations that broadcast on FM frequency 107.6 MHz:

In China
 CNR Music Radio in Chengdu
 CNR The Voice of China in Datong
 Radio Guangdong Wenti Guangbo

Germany
 Big FM (Kaiserslautern frequency)

India
 AIR Gyan Vani FM

Republic of Ireland
 Inishowen Community Radio (Moville frequency)

Israel
 Kol Play

Kosovo
 Radio Drenica

Malaysia
 goXuan (Penang frequency)

Nepal
 Community Radio Madi FM 107.6 MHz, Basantapur Madi Chitwan

New Zealand
 George FM (Southland frequency)

Russia
 Gorod FM

Turkey
 Akra FM

United Kingdom
 Capital Mid-Counties in Banbury
 Dawn FM
 Fire Radio
 Capital Liverpool
 Greatest Hits Radio Berkshire & North Hampshire
 KMFM Ashford
 Life FM (Harlesden)
 Heart Yorkshire (Bradford frequency)

References

Lists of radio stations by frequency